Andrey Slavov Toshev (16 April 1867, Stara Zagora – 10 January 1944) was Prime Minister of Bulgaria in 1935. He was also a Bulgarian scientist and a diplomat. Toshev was a professor of botany.

Appointed by Tsar Boris III, Toshev was chosen for his unflinching loyalty in the uncertainty following the counter coup by Boris loyalists against the government of Zveno that had assumed power in a coup the previous year. He headed a purely civilian cabinet after a period of military rule and was, in effect, a puppet of the Tsar. Indeed, at 68 years of age, the Premiership was Toshev's first major political role. His task was to contain the military, work on the constitution, and to construct a new popular movement. His Premiership proved short-lived since he made no progress on any of those fronts by November. At that time, it was discovered that Damyan Velchev had slipped back into the country — presumably with the intention of conspiring against the king — and Toshev was replaced by Georgi Kyoseivanov.

Toshev also served in diplomatic roles as the Bulgarian ambassador to Serbia from 1909 to 1913, in which capacity he helped bring about the formation of the Balkan League. He was also as the Bulgarian ambassador to Constantinople from 1913 to 1914 and instrumental in negotiating the Treaty of Constantinople.

References

 

1867 births
1944 deaths
Politicians from Stara Zagora
Bulgarian botanists
Bulgarian educators
Bulgarian diplomats
Prime Ministers of Bulgaria
Members of the Bulgarian Academy of Sciences
Ambassadors of Bulgaria to Switzerland